Kim Chang-son (born 11 April 1952) is a North Korean long-distance runner. He competed in the marathon at the 1972 Summer Olympics and the 1976 Summer Olympics.

References

1952 births
Living people
Athletes (track and field) at the 1972 Summer Olympics
Athletes (track and field) at the 1976 Summer Olympics
North Korean male long-distance runners
North Korean male marathon runners
Olympic athletes of North Korea
Place of birth missing (living people)